Photoplay the sixth studio album by Australian rock band, Sherbet released in June 1977. The album peaked at number 4 on the Kent Music Report.

At the Australian 1977 King of Pop Awards the song won Most Popular Australian Album.

The album was titled Magazine in North America.

Reception
Cash Box magazine said "Their soft toned harmonies smooth the rough edges when the rock gets gritty, but the overall mood is one of studied balance and control."

Track listing

Personnel 
 Bass, vocals – Tony Mitchell
 Drums – Alan Sandow
 Guitar, vocals – Harvey James
 Keyboards, vocals – Garth Porter
 Lead vocals – Daryl Braithwaite
Production
 Photography By – Graeme Webber
 Producer – Richard Lush, Sherbet
 Remastered By – William Bowden

Charts

Release history

References 

Sherbet (band) albums
1977 albums
EMI Records albums
Epic Records albums
Festival Records albums
Infinity Records albums
MCA Records albums
Albums produced by Richard Lush
Albums produced by Clive Shakespeare
Albums produced by Garth Porter